The main character of the American television sitcom Frasier is Frasier Crane. Other regular characters include: his father Martin, his brother Niles, producer Roz Doyle, and his live-in caregiver Daphne Moon. Other minor characters made regular appearances.

Main characters 

 Kelsey Grammer as Frasier Crane, a pedantic, finicky, scrupulous, and pontifical radio psychiatrist. Growing up with a cultured mother and "Average Joe" father, Frasier is the epitome of upper-class sophistication, yet is still capable of working-class enjoyments. After returning to Seattle from Boston, he begins to embrace his more cultured background but develops a more snobbish and haughty self; this is possibly due to rekindling his relationship with his brother Niles Crane. Despite his pretentious demeanour, Frasier has a good heart and strong moral compass.
 Jane Leeves as Daphne Moon (later Daphne Crane), a Mancunian physiotherapist and live-in housekeeper hired by Frasier to help Martin with his physiotherapy. Daphne's eccentric, working-class background and self-professed psychic abilities (which often end up being correct) frequently lead to Daphne's comical non-sequiturs about her unusual family, to the Cranes' incredulity. Despite her background, Niles falls for her instantly. Niles' obsession with Daphne and her obliviousness of this obsession is developed throughout the earlier seasons of the series. 
 David Hyde Pierce as Niles Crane, Frasier's younger brother, a psychiatrist in private practice. Fastidious, fussy, and far snobbier than Frasier, Niles' pedantic, neurotic qualities provide a foil for Frasier's own idiosyncrasies. He is also loyal, chivalrous, and incredibly loving, which more than makes up for it in the eyes of his loved ones. Niles is very close to his older brother, though their fiercely competitive natures provide much of the humour. Like Frasier, Niles also prefers fine arts, music, and intellectual pursuits to activities like sports, though (surprisingly given Niles' clumsiness and lack of hand-eye coordination) he excels in squash and croquet. Niles is especially Mysophobic, given to wiping his hands after human contact and wiping down chairs in public places before sitting on them.
 Peri Gilpin as Roz Doyle, the producer of Frasier's radio show. Originating from Bloomer, Wisconsin, Roz is an attractive single woman with a euphonious voice much-remarked amongst Frasier's listeners. She has no shame about her serial dating, which is the subject of many jokes and snide remarks, particularly from Frasier's brother Niles and various other characters.
 John Mahoney as Martin Crane, Frasier and Niles's father, a down-to-earth and unpretentious Seattle police detective who was forced to retire from the force due to a gunshot wound to his hip. Due to this injury inhibiting him from living alone, Martin is forced to accept Frasier's invitation to live with him upon Frasier's return to Seattle. Though his sons share very little in common with him in terms of hobbies and personalities, their relationship deepens over the seasons of the show. Martin's relationship with his Jack Russell terrier, Eddie, beer-drinking (specifically Ballantine), and his pea-green recliner are a perpetual source of irritation for Frasier.

Crane men love interests 

As many of the plots on Frasier surround the romantic entanglements of the Crane men, several women have significant minor roles in the series. The more significant of these are listed below, excluding Daphne Moon:

Sherry Dempsey 
Sherry Dempsey (Marsha Mason) is a bartender at McGinty's, Martin's favorite bar, and, for a short time, Martin's girlfriend. Sherry is fun-loving, brash, loud, and crass, and she and Martin share many interests. Frasier and Niles dislike her, but the brothers nevertheless attempt to tolerate her for the sake of family unity. This extends to the point that, when Sherry and Martin split, Frasier attempts to reunite them despite it being against his own interests. Martin and Sherry eventually break up at a bar when Martin wants to marry, but Sherry wants to keep the relationship casual. As father and son watch a basketball game and drink beers at that bar, Martin confides to Frasier that while he wanted to marry Sherry, he could not bring himself to propose as he already knew what her response would be.

Faye Moskowitz 
Faye Moskowitz (Amy Brenneman) is a former lawyer turned pastry chef who is a love interest to Frasier during the sixth season. While Christmas shopping with Roz, he meets Faye's mother. Thinking Frasier is Jewish because she sees him buying a menorah for his son, Mrs. Moskowitz takes a liking to him and hooks him up with Faye. Despite a decent first date, Faye breaks up with him for a while when she embarks on a planned trip to Paris. By the time Faye returns to Seattle towards the end of the season, Frasier is already dating a KACL marketing manager named Cassandra Stone (played by Virginia Madsen). Almost immediately, Frasier finds himself torn between both women, and, although Frasier eventually chooses Faye, he constantly calls her "Cassandra" by mistake. To cover this, Frasier tells her that Cassandra is his aunt. But when Faye learns the truth, she breaks up with him for good.

Mel Karnofsky Crane 
Dr. Melinda "Mel" Karnofsky Crane (Jane Adams) is Maris Crane's plastic surgeon, and for a period, Niles Crane's girlfriend and wife. She is fussy, neurotic, and fastidious, much like Niles. Similarly, she is the sort of manipulative, controlling female Niles is attracted to. Although she and Niles genuinely love each other, everyone else thinks she's a bad influence on him. It is heavily implied in her first appearance that she is much older than she appears, probably due to her profession. Mel also has one son and is divorced. Just two days prior to Daphne's planned marriage to Donny, Niles and Mel impulsively elope. After Niles runs off with Daphne on the day of her intended wedding to Donny, Mel is humiliated and bitter. She pays Niles back by refusing to grant an immediate divorce; instead, she forces Niles to play along that the two remain happily married, assuring him that after he has done this on several select social occasions she will file for divorce. It quickly becomes apparent that she is deliberately prolonging the process while ensuring the maximum public humiliation for Niles. At a social event held by Frasier, Mel finally pushes Niles to the limit; Niles publicly disowns "this sham of a marriage", and the two are quickly divorced.

Charlotte 
Charlotte (Laura Linney), the founder-owner of Charlotte's Web dating service, is a matchmaker recently arrived from Chicago and Frasier's final love interest on the series. Frasier initially hires her to set him up with someone following a particularly grim period regarding his romantic prospects. Charlotte sends Frasier on several bad dates, who later discovers that she had set him up with random strangers rather than his "ideal matches" as her business was failing, as she had eaten into her savings to establish the business and maintain an image as a successful businesswoman, and as Frasier was her first and only client. When they get to know each other, Frasier finds himself falling in love with her. She eventually returns his feelings, but the relationship is forced to end prematurely when Charlotte, having bought back her old business from her ex-husband, moves back to Chicago. Frasier, initially claiming not to have any regrets about letting her go, accepts a high-paying job offer in San Francisco. The series ends with Frasier on a plane, but it is revealed at the last minute that he had chosen love over career as the plane lands in Chicago, where he hopes to reunite with Charlotte.

Kelly Easterbrook 

Kelly Easterbrook (Sela Ward) is a supermodel, part-time, in order to support her zoology PhD work. She and Frasier meet on a plane to Acapulco, where Kelly is headed to observe spiny-tailed iguanas. After they spend the night together, she reveals that she is in the process of breaking up with a player from the Seattle Seahawks and "doesn't want any publicity". She does not want anyone to know that she and Frasier are consummating their relationship, and asks him not to tell. He is covert with friends and attempts discretion with his family members, but in both cases it is interpreted as loneliness. He states he is tired of the pity and ends up stating that he met a supermodel in Acapulco who would like him to be discreet. He reveals that it is Kelly Easterbrook, "the lotion girl" as Daphne refers to her. When they do not believe him, he tries to take a snapshot of her in bed with him, prompting her to dump him. Ironically, this is when his family finally sees her.

Ronee Lawrence Crane 
Veronica "Ronee" Lawrence Crane (Wendie Malick) is Niles and Frasier's old babysitter, and the first woman to break Frasier's heart (he used to watch her kiss her boyfriend through the balusters). She is also responsible for Niles' compulsive furniture-wiping, as she told him stories when he was a child about earwigs laying eggs on all the furniture, which would hatch, crawl into his ears, and eat his brain.

In 2003, she meets Frasier by chance and soon starts dating Martin (whom she had a crush on as a teenager). They get married the following year, on May 15 (Eddie's birthday), in the show's final episode, "Goodnight, Seattle".

She released an album called Mood Swings, and works as a lounge singer and pianist at the Wellington Club. Ronee drives a red 1959 Cadillac Eldorado. Her traditionally minded, prudish mother lives in Spokane, Washington.

Claire French 
Claire (Patricia Clarkson) is a friend of Frasier's old date / high school prom queen. She appears in season 8. Although his family and friends think she is perfect for him, Frasier's fear of abandonment prompts him to break up with her, leading to a serious evaluation of all his past relationships.

Crane family members 
The following are significant members of the Crane family, excluding Frasier, Martin, Niles, and Daphne Crane. Although most of the series revolves around Frasier Crane and his immediate family, occasionally members of Frasier's extended family appear. These are listed below.

David Crane 
David is Niles' and Daphne's son. He was born in the two-part episode "Goodnight, Seattle". During Daphne's pregnancy, it is implied he takes after his low-brow maternal uncles (Daphne's brothers); for example, he kicks away classical music and jumps at the mention of a pub. He was born in a veterinary clinic and is named after show's creator David Angell, who died along with his wife Lynn aboard American Airlines Flight 11 during the September 11, 2001 attacks.

Eddie
Eddie (born May 1990) is a Jack Russell Terrier. Eddie was originally played by Moose, and later by Moose's son, Enzo.

Eddie is known for responding to Martin and Daphne with human-like understanding, and often seems to taunt Frasier. In one episode, "Three Dates and a Break Up", Eddie eats the meals Frasier prepared for his dates as if he, Eddie, knew that Frasier's dates would not be staying for dinner. An early recurring gag had Eddie staring unceasingly at Frasier, often wanting something, to Frasier's increasing annoyance. Frasier's ex-wife Lilith is the only one who scares Eddie, and whenever she is around, Eddie does exactly as Lilith says.

In a flashback in the episode "The Return of Martin Crane", Martin (shortly before being shot) is shown having just bought a goldfish named "Eddie". His partner suggests that he should have got himself a dog instead, to which Martin responds that he is not a dog person.

Frederick Crane 
Frederick Gaylord Crane (born October 1989, played by twins Christopher and Kevin Graves in Cheers, Luke Tarsitano in 1995, Trevor Einhorn from 1996 until 2003) is the son of Frasier and Lilith Sternin. "Freddy" was born in the Cheers episode "The Stork Brings A Crane"; he appears in several episodes throughout the show's run. In the episode "Breaking In Is Hard to Do", which aired a year after his birth episode, he spoke his first word: "Norm!" He lives with his mother in Boston, but often comes to visit Frasier in Seattle on the holidays. Through his mother, he is Jewish; his bar mitzvah was most notable for his mother's emotional breakdown and his father's ill-advised attempt to make a speech in Hebrew (but in fact in Klingon) (as seen in the tenth-season episode Star Mitzvah, which reveals Freddy's middle name, Gaylord). In his first appearance, he has Lilith's hair color, but when he returns, he has Frasier's.

Frederick was born during Cheers eighth-season episode "The Stork Brings a Crane". He was delivered in a taxicab while Lilith was on her way home from the hospital after an episode of false labor. Lilith tolerated the pain by biting down on one of the cab driver's fuzzy dice. Initially, his personality is very undeveloped, as he is just a small child. In early seasons, he is portrayed as having numerous rather debilitating allergies and being rather inexpert when faced with a number of more or less mundane social situations (as seen in the fourth-season episode "A Lilith Thanksgiving"). He is known to be intelligent, achieving high academic scores, and is accepted to the Marbury Academy, an exclusive Boston private school. In addition to his intelligence, he shares several family traits, including a talent for chess, and his mother's talent at Machiavellian scheming based on an understanding of behaviorist psychology. He shares both his Uncle Niles' lack of coordination and his spelling skill, becoming one of the two final contestants on the National Spelling Championship. As he gets older, more traits begin to develop. At around seven, he develops a crush on Daphne, much to Niles' jealousy. As he gets older he begins to get somewhat spoiled and surly, and enjoys Frasier's company less and less, prompting Frasier to fear a growing generation gap, particularly when Freddy becomes a goth, but father and son are able to bond over their mutual bad luck with the opposite gender. At the end of the series, he is 15 years old.

Frederick's chronologically last appearance in the Cheers/Frasier universe is during the epilogue of the tenth-season Cheers episode "I'm Okay, You're Defective", described as taking place "Many years later". It shows an older Lilith and adult Frederick (played by Rob Neukirch) sitting for the reading of Frasier's will.

 Hester Crane Hester Rose Crane, née Palmer (Nancy Marchand in Cheers, Rita Wilson in Frasier) was Martin's wife and Niles's and Frasier's mother. By the time the series begins, she has been dead for approximately six years.  Hester Crane died in 1987 of lung cancer.  Hester appears in a dream sequence (experienced by Frasier in the episode "Don Juan In Hell") and in 8 mm cine transferred to video (in the seventh-season episode "Momma Mia" where Rita Wilson also plays Mia Preston who is the spitting image of Hester).

Hester first appeared (played by Nancy Marchand) in a third-season episode of Cheers ("Diane Meets Mom") in which Hester threatened to kill Diane Chambers if Diane did not stop seeing Frasier. This Hester was duplicitous, manipulative and controlling, more so than the recollections and descriptions of her in the later series. Frasier is surprised by her threats, and says she "has always been the most gentle, rational human being [he] had ever known."

Rita Wilson would play a middle-aged version of Hester in the two-part episode "Don Juan in Hell", using prosthetic makeup.

Hester was a research psychiatrist and met Martin, a cop, in 1952 when she was profiling a murderer. She rejected his first marriage proposal, but the two married when she became pregnant with Frasier. As they did not know better in the 1950s, Hester smoked during at least her first pregnancy. Hester had an affair with a family friend when Frasier and Niles were still children, and she and Martin were subsequently separated for a time.

Hester was the inspiration for both Frasier and Niles to go into the profession. She named her two sons after favorite lab rats. Both her sons take after her more than they do their father, being intellectually pompous, which causes Roz and Martin — especially given her infidelity — to consider that Hester's one-time lab assistant Leland Barton (David Ogden Stiers) might be the boys' biological father. (Without knowing Martin's concerns, Barton reveals he is gay, implying he is not their father). For example, Frasier and Niles quote her as saying "a handshake is as good as a hug." When his snobbish sons embarrass him at "The Timber Mill", a steakhouse chosen by Martin, Martin points out that his wife "may have had fancy tastes, but she had too much class to ever make me or anybody else feel second-rate", and was willing to eat hot dogs and watch ballgames with him. While her sons mostly took after her, certain aspects come from neither Hester nor Martin. According to Martin, both he and Hester always hated sherry, which Frasier and Niles love.

 Maris Crane Maris Crane is Niles Crane's wife for the first few seasons of the series. She is unseen on camera, but often the subject of plotlines and jokes. Maris is immensely wealthy, much wealthier than Niles, as well as spoiled, dominating, and neurotic. Many of the characters pointedly dislike her (to Niles' consternation), with Frasier contributing in the show's first episode, "Maris is like the sun ... except without the warmth".

As a child, Maris was overweight, but started losing weight and soon became very thin. She is described as small, very pale, and pathologically emaciated; Roz originally mistook her for a hat rack, and Niles noted that she once sat on a whoopee cushion without setting it off.

Maris lived in her family's mansion, which has been in the family for four generations, after they made their fortune from urinal cakes. She met Niles during his internship in Seattle when he stopped to help her as she was banging on the electric gates to get into her home. They were married three years later, in 1986.

Maris makes only two onscreen "appearances": once in the episode "Voyage of the Damned" when her shadow is seen through a shower curtain (she is spoken to but makes no reply), and again in "Rooms with a View", where she appears in Niles' memory, almost completely covered by bandages after surgery. In "The Seal Who Came to Dinner", the pass-code to Maris's seaside home is described as her "ideal weight", and "what she weighed at her débutante ball" during her pageant years. The series of numbers that Niles punched in would mean that Maris, at that time, was 45 pounds and 12 ounces (20.8 kg). Aside from her low weight, Maris is subject to various medical problems: she has abnormally tight quadriceps, a rigid spine, many and very specific allergies, she cannot produce saliva, and has a slight webbing of her hands that made her self-conscious enough to shy away from their physical touch. She frequently travels to Europe for plastic surgery and expensive, eccentric health treatments.

In 1993, Maris and Niles refer Frasier to Daphne Moon (Niles' future wife) as a live-in physical therapist for Martin. Two years later, Maris goes to New York without telling Niles, who worries greatly and is then infuriated by her rash, selfish disappearance (with encouragement from Frasier). On her return, Niles finally stands up to Maris, and she promptly kicks him out of the house, beginning a two-year separation. Maris eventually reunites with Niles, but immediately has an affair with their marital therapist, Dr. Bernard Shenkman. In 1998, Niles finally files for divorce. In spite of the finalized divorce, Maris and Niles continue to be codependent for some time, until Niles finally breaks completely free, largely due to Daphne's aggravation.

In 2003, Maris becomes romantically involved with a violent Argentinian polo player, Esteban de Rojo (Victor Alfieri), whom she kills in self-defense. Consequently, she is jailed for a few months on suspicion of murder. In 2004, shortly before her trial is scheduled to begin, she escapes to her family's private island from which she cannot be extradited, effectively stranding her for life.

The character was not originally meant to be unseen. The creators of the series intended to show her after only a few episodes of referring to her, but nothing came of this. The writers of the show decided that they had created so many quirks for the character - both mental and physical - that the character had become uncastable. They therefore decided to make the character permanently unseen.

 Nikos Crane Nikos Crane (Joseph Will) is the son of Walt and Zora Crane. He is Martin's nephew, and Frasier and Niles' cousin. Nikos was originally going to attend medical school, but became a juggler after receiving some advice from Frasier, about which Zora was quite angry.

 Walter "Walt" Crane Walter "Walt" Crane (John Mahon) is Martin's brother and the uncle of Frasier and Niles. He appears only once, in an episode in which he and Martin meet again, only to become separated again by the end of the episode. In the episode "Author, Author" when Frasier and Niles are having a fight, Martin tells them a story about a dispute he once had with a partner. His first words are "Now, I never had a brother..." However, the story that Martin tells the boys turns out to be a lie, which he reveals to Daphne after the boys make up and leave.

 Zora Crane Zora Crane, (Patti LuPone) a Greek woman, is Walt Crane's wife, Martin's sister-in-law, and the aunt of Frasier and Niles, and the one responsible for Walt and Martin's estrangement. Savagely domineering, she is notable for having violent outbursts. According to family lore, when the Nazis invaded Greece, the five-year-old Zora joined the partisans just to strangle Nazis with her jump ropes.

 Lilith Sternin Lilith Sternin (Bebe Neuwirth) is the ex-wife of Frasier Crane and mother of their son, Frederick. A cold, remote woman, she is disliked by most of his family and friends. Lilith appeared as a prominent character on Cheers, in which Frasier also first appeared. Her relationship with ex-spouse Frasier is polite yet distant in the early seasons, becoming more cordial in the final seasons.

Nanette Guzman/"Nanny G"Nanny G is Frasier's first wife and a well-known children's entertainer. She first appeared in the tenth-season episode of Cheers, titled "One Hugs, the Other Doesn't", played by Emma Thompson.  She then appeared in the Frasier Season 9 premiere episode "Don Juan in Hell" in a fantasy sequence as a young hippie from Frasier's memory (played by Dina Spybey). Her final appearance was in the final season of Frasier in the episode "Caught in the Act", this time played by Laurie Metcalf, who proclaims, "Do you have any idea what it's like to play the same character for twenty years?!" – an in-joke reference to Grammer's own twenty-year portrayal of Frasier Crane on Cheers, Wings and Frasier (and years later, Metcalf would find herself in the same situation, in the role of Jackie Harris on Roseanne and The Conners). Frasier and Nanette were briefly married while he was an undergraduate; the ceremony occurred at City Hall. The two experienced a strong sexual chemistry, but Frasier claims that the marriage could not work because of their youth and naïveté.

 Aunt Vivienne 
An unseen character central to the episode "Beloved Infidel". Her nickname is "The Mouth" and Niles describes her as the "keeper of the Crane family skeletons". When Frasier and Niles suspect Martin of having an affair in their childhood, Niles plans to call her to find out, but Frasier stops him. Niles suggests Frasier is worried what he might find out; he replies "Yes; that she knows where I live and that she still drives!".

 KACL staff and professionals 
This section outlines the various people with whom Frasier works with at KACL 780 AM (the radio station from which Frasier's show is broadcast).

 Bob "Bulldog" Briscoe Bob "Bulldog" Briscoe (Dan Butler) hosts the Gonzo Sports Show, KACL's highest-rated show among most demographics. He is a volatile, boorish, intensely macho sports philosopher, who often makes the ever urbane Frasier the butt of his jokes. His catch phrase is "THIS STINKS! THIS IS TOTAL BS!", often said after he misplaces something, only to find it immediately afterwards. Bulldog is obnoxiously discourteous and often insults his coworkers, interviewees and callers, yet he is apparently very popular, and receives as much affection and admiration, as angry calls; "Guys love me; chicks pretend not to".

Bulldog is a womanizer, but has somewhat of a lingering crush on Roz. Following a short affair with her, Bulldog reveals his feelings towards Roz to be genuine, but they prove to be unrequited. Due to a decline in ratings, his show is cancelled, and he is fired at the end of season 6, Bulldog works as a pizza delivery man until he is re-hired to work in the KACL archives. He is seen sporadically throughout the remainder of the series, usually appearing with a crude remark or playing a practical joke.

Contrary to his overbearing "machismo", Bulldog has a fear of reptiles and once jumped on a desk in panic when a small lizard got loose in the studio. He also used a pregnant Roz and later his elderly mother as human shields to protect himself from gunmen – the first incident being an attempted hold-up at the coffee shop for which Bulldog was given and enthusiastically accepted, undeserved praise for his role in foiling, and the second a false shout by Martin to expose this cowardice at an awards ceremony for Bulldog's 'bravery', after Frasier's more subtle attempts to have Bulldog come clean failed miserably.

Bulldog was credited as a regular cast member in several episodes from seasons four through to six, until the character was fired from KACL. His last appearance is in the season 11 episode "Frasier-Lite", and is notable for being one of the show's major recurring characters not present at Frasier's farewell speech in the series finale.

 Chopper Dave Chopper Dave (Richard Poe) is a Vietnam War veteran who hosts KACL's Eye in the Sky traffic reports. He has a tendency to speak very loudly due to spending time trying to speak over the din of his helicopter. He has also been known to annoy his colleagues by flying his helicopter very close to their apartment windows.

 Father Mike Mancuso 
Father Mike (George DelHoyo) is a clergyman who serves as host of Religion on the Line at KACL. He appears or is referenced in various episodes throughout the first two seasons, before being fired by new station manager Kate Costas in the first episode of season 3, seemingly for no reason other than the fact Kate found his show boring – something which concerned Frasier, whose show had similar audience figures.

 Gil Chesterton Gilbert "Gil" Leslie Chesterton (Edward Hibbert) is the host of Restaurant Beat on KACL. He is a pompous, effeminate, over-refined food-critic whose taste buds are insured. In his first appearance, Gil is somewhat antagonistic towards Frasier and vying for his KACL time-slot, though in subsequent appearances the issue is no longer contentious. Believed by his coworkers to be in the closet, Gil claims to be married to a woman named Deb, a "Sarah Lawrence graduate and the owner of a very successful auto body repair shop", as well as an Army Reservist, but his co-workers believe "Deb" is Gil's pet cat and do not believe the latter, either. Much of the humour related to Gil stems from his adamant denial of his seeming homosexual orientation, as well as his overall catty snarkiness. In a season eleven episode, Frasier is falsely outed on the air, after being seen at a local gay bar; Gil is seen coyly reading a newspaper outside the same bar during the episode's closing-credits before entering the bar. In "The Impossible Dream", Frasier is disturbed to find that he is having overtly sexual dreams about Gil.

Gil drives a red BMW with a red interior and is almost always seen wearing his trademark bow tie. It is also revealed that Gil wears an ankle bracelet. He claims to be a veteran of the armed services (he once refers to having "seen some cruel pranks in the Army"). His last appearance is in the show's two part finale Goodnight, Seattle where he is seen along with Kenny Daly, Roz, Daphne, Bebe, Noel, Martin, Ronee, Niles, and the rest of the KACL staff watching Frasier give his farewell speech.

The character is named in honor of series producer Christopher Lloyd's journalism teacher at Beverly Hills High School.

 Greg 
Greg was the station manager in 1997. He is mentioned only in "The 1000th Show".

 Julia Wilcox Julia Wilcox (Felicity Huffman) becomes the new financial reporter for KACL late in the series' run. She is the author of two books, Practical Applications of Econometrics and Day Trade Your Way Out of Debt, the latter of which had stirred some controversy and had eventually contributed to her being fired from CNBC.

Her no-nonsense, all-business demeanor and arrogant and stand-offish attitude earn her the dislike of the other staff, especially Roz Doyle. Frasier makes an advance towards her in a moment of anger-induced passion, similar to a scene in an episode with Kate Costas, with Frasier even using some of the same insults and quoting a line by Sam Malone to Diane Chambers in Cheers "Are you as turned on as I am?", which results in the entire station being forced to attend a sexual harassment seminar. When Julia promises not to sue Frasier or the station, the entire staff walks out from the seminar.

When Frasier discovers that his accountant and former Oxford classmate, Avery (John Hannah), is cheating on his wife with Julia, he confronts Avery, unaware that Julia is hiding in a closet, overhearing the entire conversation. Julia's attitude towards Frasier begins to soften after this display of chivalry on his part, and she uses her connections to have Ben, a British street musician (Elvis Costello) whom Frasier and Niles find annoying, then playing a regular gig at Café Nervosa, offered a full-time job elsewhere.

She and Frasier have a brief romantic encounter, much to Roz's chagrin. Julia and Roz end up verbally attacking each other after Julia suspects Roz's feeling for Frasier. He ends up siding with Julia, causing Roz to take a new position and leave KACL, albeit temporarily. Her boorish and coarse behavior towards Martin, Niles, and Daphne ultimately persuades Frasier to break off their relationship.

 Kate Costas Kate Costas (Mercedes Ruehl) is one of several KACL station managers before Kenny. Frasier and Kate have a love-hate relationship, finding themselves on opposite sides of programming decisions and union negotiations. They have a brief affair before Kate leaves to accept a management position at a Chicago station in "The Adventures of Bad Boy and Dirty Girl".

 Kenny Daly Kenny Daly (Tom McGowan) is a long-time radio man; apparently a successful DJ in the past, in 1993 he was reduced to delivering pizzas as he was out of work at the time. Kenny was married with at least three children, but got divorced in 2003, following which he suffered a breakdown.

Kenny becomes the new station manager of KACL in 1998. A likable and relaxed manager, he soon becomes friends with all the staff there. When he took over in "Sweet Dreams", he gave Frasier the ultimatum of doing an ad he could not endorse or be fired. Kenny fires Frasier, but rehires him an hour and a half later. Kenny then goes to station owner Joe Martin to tell him about Frasier's complaint and is fired (this is the time that KACL becomes an all-Salsa station as Joe Martin, inadvertently inspired by Frasier, goes back to his birth name, José Martinez, and rediscovers his Latin roots). Kenny occasionally performs the unscrupulous acts of his predecessors, such as firing and lying to the talent, but often feels guilty and admits to it shortly afterward. Kenny is fairly lowbrow and has tastes and pleasures similar to Martin Crane, which occasionally grates against Frasier's more refined sensibilities. Kenny resigns as station manager after deciding to go back to DJing, and Roz is appointed as his replacement. He is last seen, along with Frasier's family, friends and KACL staff, watching him do his farewell speech.

 Ned Miller 
Ned Miller (John Glover) was the station manager in 1993. He is fired in "Oops", right after firing Frasier, rendering the firing of Frasier null and void. He tapes everything said in his office.

 Noel Shempsky Noel Shempsky (Patrick Kerr) is a painfully geeky Trekkie who keeps an autographed picture of William Shatner as Captain Kirk on his desk and is fluent in Klingon. His station nickname is "Noel the Mole". He is also good friends with Bill Gates, offering a Vulcan salute to Gates when he appears on Frasier's show in "The Two Hundredth". Noel is such an avid Star Trek fan that William Shatner has a restraining order against him.

He works in sales at KACL and drives a '73 Dodge Polara. He and Roz go out for a drink, and he falls in love with her.  In his attempt to win her heart, he gives her a spice rack that he made. Roz, who does not feel the same way about him, was even willing to date a lesbian instead of him once. In the episode "Star Mitzvah" it is revealed that Noel is Jewish, and is fluent in Hebrew.

His claim to fame, as seen when he volunteers to be the station representative during contract negotiations, is that he can faint at will. It has also been mentioned in the episode "A New Position for Roz" that Noel has never missed a day of work. He was even retained by KACL when it changed formats to Salsa radio and fired most of the talk radio personnel, due to his mastery of Spanish and his never ever having a sick day. Noel shows attraction to Roz throughout the series, leading to often embarrassing attempts to impress her. In the final episode, he finally kisses her after she becomes the station manager.

 Poppy Delafield 
Poppy (Katie Finneran) is introduced in season 7 as an intern at KACL. She annoys her coworkers with her overly talkative manner and lack of intelligence, and only has her job because her mother owns the station. When Niles gets a job as an arts critic, Frasier becomes jealous and persuades Poppy to ask her mother to start a culture review show on KACL. However, Poppy does not realize that Frasier wants to host the show and ends up hosting it herself, to disastrous effect. Later in the season, she meets Niles and becomes attracted to him. The two set a date to attend an upcoming ball, but due to a series of misunderstandings between them and Frasier, the brothers start to argue and scare away both Poppy and Frasier's date.

 Thomas "Tom" Duran 
Thomas "Tom" Duran (Eric Lutes) was an openly gay station manager during the second season. In "The Matchmaker", Frasier unwittingly asks Tom out on a date, intending to fix him up with Daphne. He appears later in the season in "Agents in America, Part III", trying to coax Bebe from jumping off the ledge of the building.

 Other shows on KACL 
There have been numerous other shows on KACL, some of which are:The Gonzo Sports Show — Hosted by Bob "Bulldog" Briscoe.Restaurant Beat — Hosted by Gilbert "Gil" Leslie Chesterton.Religion on the Line — Hosted by Fr. Mike Mancuso, canceled by Kate Costas.Pet Chat with Nanette — Hosted by Nanette, canceled by Kate Costas.Amber Edwards Book Chat — Hosted by Amber Edwards.Health Watch — Hosted by Dr. Clint Weber.Storytime Theater — Hosted by Tooty, the Story Lady.Teen Scene — Hosted by Trent, Emily and Ryan. The show is featured on the season nine episode "Juvenilia" when Frasier acts as a guest. Despite his initial belief that the show will be an easy ride, he quickly learns that the three hosts have an abrasive, interrogative style of hosting, leaving Frasier feeling exposed and dumbfounded.The Morning Zoo with Carlos and The Chicken — KACL's morning show hosted by Carlos and Dwayne a.k.a. "The Chicken".Let's Go Camping — Hosted by Dan and Jenna, disappeared inexplicably.Dr. Nora — a second advice show on KACL, hosted by Dr. Nora Fairchild (recommended by Frasier), this show lasted for about two weeks.Dr. Mary — a third advice show on KACL, hosted by ex-temp producer Mary Thomas.Car Chat with Bob and Bethany — Hosted by Bob and Bethany; Martin mistakes Bethany for a man.Money Matters — Julia Wilcox (Felicity Huffman), financial reporter, formerly of CNBC, to whom Frasier is forced to devote part of his show. He has a brief affair with her later.

 Other radio shows mentioned KeKe and Mel's Drivetime Circus — Mentioned by Opera Director Allister Berk (Patrick Stewart) in season 11 episode  "The Doctor is Out".

And many other shows (the names of which were not given) but the hosts are:Ray Schmidt, the "Green Grocer".Bonnie Weems, the "Auto Lady".Leo Pascali, the "Happy Chef". In season 3 episode "Leapin' Lizards" the host of The Happy Chef is shown on a schedule as Floyd Lovett.Miss Judy, Arts and crafts.Helen Grogan, "Ma Nature".Chester Ludgate, KACL's "lovable curmudgeon" commentator.

 Moon family members 
This section discusses the more significant members of Daphne Moon's working-class family, who hail from Manchester, United Kingdom. Many of the actors who play Moon family members do not have specifically Mancunian English accents: Anthony LaPaglia and Richard E. Grant, who portray two of Daphne's brothers, were not born in the United Kingdom (LaPaglia is Australian, and Grant was born in Eswatini). This apparent discrepancy is never addressed on the show, but may be taken as an in-joke (see below).

 Gertrude Moon Gertrude Moon (Millicent Martin) is Daphne's mother. The two have a difficult and complex relationship, and Daphne appears to dislike her mother immensely while still remaining intensely loyal and subservient to her. Domineering and conniving, Gertrude is doting and always forgiving towards her son Simon's selfish behavior but is hyper-critical of her ever-supportive and long-suffering daughter, frequently guilting Daphne into providing what she wants. When Gertrude leaves her husband, she goes to Seattle. There, she unsuccessfully tries to start a romance with Martin and briefly lives with Niles and Daphne, where she quickly overstays her welcome. When Daphne finally snaps and throws her out, she immediately breaks down with guilt, Niles offers to move her to an apartment of her own so that she can remain in Seattle with her daughter.

 Grammy Moon Grammy Moon, Daphne's paternal grandmother, is frequently mentioned but never seen or heard from on the show (see also: Maris Crane). She and her numerous eccentricities, cooking tips and health complaints are frequently the subject of Daphne's long-winded stories.

 Harry Moon Harry Moon (Brian Cox) is Daphne's father. Although he is an alcoholic and a layabout (who supports his drinking via the money given to him by men who attempt to impress their girlfriends by pretending to hit Harry after he pretends to chat up their girlfriends), his relationship with Daphne is closer than the relationship between Daphne and her mother. Seemingly trapped in a long-suffering marriage with his wife, he eventually left her. With Niles' intervention, they attempted a reconciliation, but it was short-lived, and Harry Moon eventually returned to the United Kingdom.

 Michael Moon Michael Moon (Robbie Coltrane) is a brother of Daphne. Michael appeared in the two-part series finale, "Goodnight, Seattle", and his speech is almost entirely incomprehensible, spoken in a very fast Lancashire accent.

He also briefly appears in "Something Borrowed, Someone Blue" played by a different actor and is mentioned in "IQ" as having lost one of his toes after falling into a frozen lake. In "Goodnight, Seattle", he is revealed to have lost another toe in a shooting incident.

 Simon Moon Simon Moon (Anthony LaPaglia) is one of Daphne's brothers. An obnoxious and boorish heavy drinker and layabout, Simon has a difficult relationship with his sister, largely because of Simon's uncouth and selfish nature. He is greatly disliked by both Frasier and Niles, partly because of their class-conscious nature but also because when in Seattle he frequently stays with one of them, often taking unreasonable liberties with regard to their homes, possessions and alcohol supplies in the process. Conversely, he gets on quite well with Martin and, despite his many negative qualities, is quite a popular man who is very successful at attracting women.

Roz is quite taken with him (and he with her) at first, but she eventually catches on to his ways and rejects his advances. Simon views her as a sex object, yet always forgets her name. During the ninth-season episodes in which he appears, he constantly calls her "Rose." Roz does not care enough at that point to even correct him.

Simon appears in nine episodes. Like the majority of the Moon family seen on the show, he does not share a Mancunian accent with Daphne: the Australian LaPaglia imitates a London 'cockney' accent. He does, on occasion, wear a Manchester United T-shirt.

 Stephen Moon Stephen Moon (Richard E. Grant) is Daphne's favorite brother. He appears in person in the series finale "Goodnight, Seattle", and speaks with Grant's trademark RP 'posh' accent, unlike the rest of the Moon family. The character also appears in the two-part episode "And the Dish Ran Away with the Spoon", where he is played by a different actor and has no speaking lines.

 Billy Moon 
Only seen briefly during Daphne and Donny Douglas' ill-fated wedding, Billy is Daphne's gay brother, a professional ballroom dancer. In an early episode Daphne states 'he's me mum's favourite. Me dad mostly flicks the crust off his kidney pie at him'. He is not directly stated to be gay, but hints are dropped that he knew from a young age, such as having sneaked peeks at his brother Nigel in the shower, and getting excited by going to the male doctor (even undressing in the car on a visit to the dentist).

 Nigel Moon 
Briefly appeared in "Something Borrowed, Someone Blue". According to Daphne, their brother Billy would spy on Nigel in the shower. He was portrayed by Cameron Dye.

 Peter Moon 
Briefly appears in "Something Borrowed, Someone Blue".

 David Moon 
Briefly appears in "Something Borrowed, Someone Blue". Coincidentally, Daphne names her and Niles's son David (though in memory of series producer David Angell).

 Doyle family members 

 Alice Doyle Alice May Doyle (played by Ashley Thomas, 2002–2004) is the daughter of Roz Doyle. She first appears as a newborn in the fifth-season episode "Life of the Party", and by the end of the series has become a child of six. In season 6, Alice is played by Shannon Curran on episode 19 “IQ.”  Her father, Rick Garrett, had only just turned 20 when Roz discovered she was pregnant with Alice, and rather than, as she thought, ruin his life, Roz decides to raise Alice herself and not burden Rick. Alice refers to Niles, Martin and Frasier as her "uncles". A running gag in the show's later seasons involved her desperate desire to be a flower girl at various weddings, but always being prevented at the last minute. She has a mildly adversarial relationship with Daphne's mother Gertrude, and a close relationship with Roz's onetime boyfriend, Roger.

 Denise Dawson Denise Dawson née Doyle (played by Suzanne Cryer) is Roz's older sister. Denise appears twice, first in "The Guilt Trippers", where Roz bemoans Denise's perfect life with her handsome husband Craig. However, there are evident cracks in the relationship, and when she next appears in "Sea Bee Jeebies", Denise receives a call from Craig telling her he is leaving her. Denise regularly puts Roz down using back-handed compliments, such as buying Roz a dress two sizes too small and telling her how good she would look in it. She ultimately gets her comeuppance when her husband leaves her for someone else, leading her to hate men.

 Jen Doyle Jen Doyle (Zooey Deschanel) is Roz's 'pushy and opinionated' cousin who visits her in Seattle. Her judgmental attitude irritates Frasier and Roz finds she cannot maintain the all night partying that Jen prefers. She forms an unlikely friendship with Kenny Daly who is inspired by her spontaneity and passion for traveling in "Kissing Cousins".

 Joanna Doyle 
Joanna Doyle (Eva Marie Saint) is Roz's mother. Currently divorced, she is the Attorney General for the state of Wisconsin. Roz frequently speaks to her openly on the phone about very personal matters, to a level that often shocks Frasier. Appeared in the "Our Parents, Ourselves" episode (played by Saint).

 Rick Garrett Rick Garrett (Todd Babcock) is a waiter at Café Nervosa who, at the age of twenty, has an affair with Roz, which results in her getting pregnant. Guilt-stricken at the news, he impulsively asks Roz to marry him, but Roz declines, insisting that he pursue his college education firstly.  Their child is Alice May Doyle.

 Niles and Maris' household staff 
This section discusses the significant members of Maris and Niles' household staff who are mentioned on the show. Of these, Marta is significant as the only member of the household staff to have both a recurring role in the series, complete with dialogue.

 Marta Marta (Irene Olga López) is Niles and Maris' elderly maid. She comes from a remote mountain village in Guatemala, and has difficulty with her English pronouns. She speaks fluent German, however, owing to her previous experience working for a German family "who turned up in Guatemala just after the war". In one episode, she translates from German to Spanish, and Frasier (mis)translates from Spanish to English for Niles, leading to comedic misunderstandings, related to a romantic entanglement. She is the only member of "Missy Crane's" household staff to be regularly seen on the show. In the episode Frasier Crane's Day Off from 1994 she is referred to as being 78 years old, meaning she would have been born in 1916.

 Yoshi Yoshi is Niles and Maris' elderly and temperamental Japanese gardener. He is frequently mentioned by Niles, usually when referring to arguments over the Zen garden Yoshi is keen to build. He is seen once on the series when Niles is addressing staff before leaving Maris. Yoshi dies of a heart attack while trimming Maris' elaborate hedge maze—Niles said, 'the paramedics never had a chance.'

 Ngee Ngee is Niles' and Maris' housekeeper. He is frequently mentioned by Niles during the beginning of the series. Given that Ngee's name seems rather hard to pronounce, Frasier constantly refers to him as "Guy" (pronounced – clearly assuming him to be French), thus causing Niles to correct him.

 Nadia Nadia is referred to as Maris' "hatchet maid" but is never seen or heard.

 Characters from Cheers 
Characters from the previous sitcom, Cheers, who are Frasier's old friends from Boston, guest star in certain episodes, influencing the episode's outcome (in addition to frequent guests Lilith and Frederick). The only surviving series regular from Cheers that never appeared on the show was Kirstie Alley, who played Rebecca Howe from 1987–1993 (seasons 6–11).

 Sam Malone Sam Malone (Ted Danson) ran the bar (Cheers) that Frasier frequented back in Boston. He appeared on one episode of Frasier, in Season Two, called "The Show Where Sam Shows Up". He is having second thoughts about his wedding to a woman (played by Téa Leoni) whom Frasier had slept with, unknowing that she and Sam were engaged. Sam breaks off the marriage when he finds out she once slept with Cliff Clavin.

 Diane Chambers Diane Chambers (Shelley Long) left Frasier at the altar during their wedding. She appeared in four episodes, three of which were only dream sequences. In season two, she first appears in a dream that Frasier had after going to a tropical island. Then in season three, Diane visits Seattle to produce a play, but confesses to Frasier she needs help because her life is a mess. Later in the series, she appears in a dream sequence in which Frasier's ex-wives, ex-girlfriends and late mother all confront him regarding his romantic failings. Diane is mentioned throughout the series by Frasier and his family as both one of his most important relationships, as well as being the cause of a notable downturn in his life after she left him at the altar.

 Woody Boyd Woody Boyd (Woody Harrelson) appears in one episode in season six when he visits Frasier in Seattle. He and Frasier reminisce about their past days at Cheers, but the more time they spend together, the more they realize they have nothing in common but memories. Realizing that, they part as friends, agreeing to meet once every five or ten (Frasier emphasizes ten) years.

 Cliff Clavin Cliff Clavin (John Ratzenberger) was in a season nine episode called "Cheerful Goodbyes" where Frasier returns to Boston for a convention and unwittingly stumbles on Cliff's retirement party, with Frasier too diplomatic to admit he had not come for the party. In a farewell speech, Frasier inadvertently convinces Cliff to stay in Boston, to the outrage of Carla, who tries to kill him with a spear gun.

 Norm Peterson Norm Peterson (George Wendt) attends the retirement party of Cliff Clavin in "Cheerful Goodbyes". He meets up with Frasier at the party, and gets along famously with Martin as a fellow beer drinker. Frasier telephones Norm in the episode "Three Dates and a Break Up".

 Carla Tortelli Carla Tortelli (Rhea Perlman) was a waitress at Cheers. She appears in "Cheerful Goodbyes" at Cliff Clavin's retirement party, ecstatic that Cliff is finally leaving Boston. She flies into a psychotic rage when Cliff announces he has decided to stay, thanks in part to Frasier. She is ready to attack Cliff with one of his gifts, a spear gun, but security drags her out.

 Barflies 
Many of the recurring barfly characters seen on Cheers also appeared in "Cheerful Goodbyes", including Paul Krapence (played by Paul Willson), Cliff's rival Walt Twitchell (played by Raye Birk), and Phil (played by Philip Perlman).

 Other characters 

 Bebe Glazer Bebe Glazer (Harriet Sansom Harris) is Frasier's agent over the course of most of the series, described by Niles as "Lady Macbeth without the sincerity" and said to have "morals that would raise eyebrows in the court of Caligula". An intensely manipulative and seductive woman, with no apparent morals whatsoever outside of getting the best deal for herself and her clients, she is often compared to the Princess of Darkness by most of the characters, Niles in particular, who comments "She's the devil, Frasier. Run fast, run far!"

The two first meet in the season 1 episode "Selling Out", in which Bebe – who introduces herself as Bulldog's agent – hears Frasier endorse a Chinese restaurant on the air and harangues him into letting her line up other such deals for him, intimating that her own experience of meeting her daughter's college fees at Stanford will stand Frasier in good stead when he sends Freddie to Harvard. He comes to rely on her in order to get the best deal he can out of his employers, whilst simultaneously frequently being horrified by her extremely flexible and questionable ethics. She harbors a deep desire to be in the limelight herself, a dream briefly realized when she and Frasier co-host a morning television show for a week in "Morning Becomes Entertainment". In the final episode, she is revealed to have a son, whose apparent age (around 40) is used to imply the talent of Bebe's cosmetic surgeon. In "Agents In America Part III", Bulldog describes Bebe as his agent, though it's likely this changed later in the series by the time he lost his job at KACL. She once seduced and attempted to marry an octogenarian multimillionaire in the hopes of inheriting his fortune upon his death, for which Frasier had to help her quit smoking over the course of a single weekend, at great stress to herself and the entire Crane family. However, during the wedding he died, whereupon she took up smoking again. She is also revealed, like Frasier, to have been an old friend of Dr. Phil, who frequently ended up owing her money as a result of their poker games.

 Donny Douglas Donald Ronald "Donny" Douglas (Saul Rubinek) is Niles' divorce lawyer and, for a period, Daphne's boyfriend and fiancé. Despite Niles's intense crush on Daphne, it is he who first introduces the two; they meet during Niles' divorce proceedings, while Donny, who is representing Niles against Maris, is helping Frasier to prepare his upcoming testimony. Although a highly successful lawyer, Donny is exceedingly boorish and brash (his antics include arriving for a meeting with Frasier and Niles in a tracksuit after a jog, and changing into his suit in front of them), and are anathema to Frasier's and Niles' refinement; his degree from the University of Las Vegas leads Yale/Cambridge-educated Niles to comment that there could have been "no problem finding tassels for those mortarboards", and although Harvard/Oxford-educated Frasier tells him to "stop being such a snob", his opinions are evidently similar. Their opinion of Donny changes when he cows a supposedly tough lawyer over the phone, greatly reducing the time Niles must wait for his day in court. Donny wins a favorable divorce settlement for Niles through his discovery that Maris' family fortune was based on urinal cakes; Niles' joy is immediately cut short when Donny starts dating Daphne.

Ultimately, Daphne leaves Donny at the altar in favor of Niles. Embittered, Donny sues both her and Frasier (who was responsible for Daphne and Niles getting together) but eventually drops the lawsuit. Daphne later encounters Donny in the final minutes before his courtroom wedding to his new fiancée. In the tenth-season premiere, "The Ring Cycle," he reappears with yet a different fiancée, a woman named Bridgett, at Daphne's courtroom wedding with Niles. Donny thanks Daphne, stating that she played a major role in his eventual happiness, as if she had not left him at the altar, he would not have met his ex-wife, who introduced him to his new bride-to-be. Donny then comments that he hopes Niles and Daphne will attend their wedding, to which Daphne, absentmindedly being polite, states the same thing, only for Donny to graciously accept her invitation. While it appears that he no longer harbors any resentment towards the couple, when Daphne states that she cannot marry Niles (as, unbeknownst to Donny, Bridgett, Frasier, Martin, and Gertrude, they eloped to Reno, Nevada a week before, and were about to be married for a third time, in order to appease Gertrude, who had missed their second wedding, which occurred in order to please Frasier and Martin), Donny is vindictive towards him, declaring "YES! I KNEW IT! Now you know what it's like to have the love of your life dump you at the altar! And good luck trying to find somebody as good, because she just ain't out there!" This shocks and insults Bridgett, who leaves, causing a distressed Donny to chase after her.

 Jerome Belasco Jerome Belasco (Harris Yulin) is an implied crime boss, whom Niles and Frasier approach to seek his help in getting one of Maris' parking tickets overturned—an action which soon comes back to haunt Frasier, as he must then provide couples counseling for Belasco's girlfriend. He was portrayed by Harris Yulin, who was nominated for an Emmy for his portrayal of Jerome.

 Kirby Gardner Kirby (Brian Klugman) is the teenage son of Lana and Bob Gardner, and sometime employee of KACL. He is briefly tutored by Frasier, with whom he develops a father-son relationship in the later portion of his appearances. When Frasier endures a brutal interview with teen radio journalists where they exploit him, Kirby comes to Frasier's aid by supplying him with embarrassing information about the journalists. He also does odd jobs for Niles. Kirby's wild hairstyle has been compared to Sideshow Bob's. Kirby is smitten with Roz Doyle, leading Frasier to manipulate Roz into escorting Kirby to the latter's high school prom as an incentive for Kirby to study and achieve good grades.

 Bob Gardner Bob Gardner (Brian Kerwin) is the husband of Lana Gardner and father of Kirby. Having previously abandoned his wife for another woman, he later had second thoughts and debated whether to return to her—coincidentally, at an airport he met up with Frasier, who was considering whether or not to pursue Lana romantically at the time, and after a brief conversation decided to remain with his wife. Frasier, who had also left the conversation with the intent to pursue Lana, decided as a consequence to withdraw and advised Lana to at least attempt to restore her marriage.

 Lana Gardner Lana Gardner, née Lynley (Jean Smart) is an old high school classmate of Frasier's, on whom both Frasier and Niles had crushes during high school. Frasier and Lana meet again as adults, and have a brief romantic relationship while Lana is estranged from her husband, Bob Gardner. Frasier calls this off owing to Lana's immensely aggressive personality. They later become friends. Lana is the mother of Kirby, and has at least one other child. In Jean Smart's first appearance as this character, she was known as Lorna Lynley—the character's name was later changed to Lana to avoid referring to a real person by that name.

 Derek Mann Derek Mann (voiced by Joe Mantegna) is a newspaper columnist who is one of Frasier's biggest critics. His columns often debase Frasier's program and often twists the doctor's innocent advice to make Frasier look bad in the eyes of the public. He once challenged Frasier to a fistfight after the doctor publicly ridiculed him on his radio show.

 Cam Winston Cam Winston (Brian Stokes Mitchell) is the deep-voiced tenant of the apartment above Frasier's and is Frasier's rival. The two frequently clash and compete over parking spaces, apartment board placement, and balcony rights. For all their rivalry, the two have near-identical tastes, mannerisms, and personalities, which prompt competitiveness between them. The two have a history of trumping each other tit-for-tat via the apartment board: while Frasier convinces the board to ban Cam from parking his Humvee in the provided garage, Cam, in passive protest, hangs an enormous American flag over Frasier's balcony, covering Frasier's view; as well as the obvious inconvenience, this incident also damages Frasier's standing with the board, as when he protests about the flag, Cam twists matters to make Frasier seem unpatriotic. When their parents feign a dating relationship to have the two come to a truce, Cam and Frasier finally end their feud and compromise with each other to please their parents. Martin and Cam's mother do eventually form a short lived relationship. Cam is exploited in the 10th-season episode, Door Jam, when Frasier finds an exclusive luxury spa invitation addressed to Cam in his own mail box due to their mail box exchange as a condition of their truce. Intrigued, Frasier and Niles go to the spa, but find that they are not on the "list", prompting Niles to impersonate Cam's vocal characteristics in the charade, to get access into the spa.

The last mention of Cam Winston is in the 11th-season episode, "Crock Tales": Frasier, Niles, Daphne, and Roz are locked out of Frasier's apartment on the balcony and yell for Cam's help after they are unable to gain the attention of Martin, who's inside with headphones on.

 Duke Duke (John LaMotta) is Martin's close friend. He briefly appears in the second-season episode "Dukes, We Hardly Knew Ye" when Martin takes Frasier and Niles to Duke's bar called "Duke's", which is demolished later in the episode. He also appears as one of Martin's poker buddies in the fifth-season episode "Where Every Bloke Knows Your Name". Sometime near the beginning of the eighth season, Duke moves to Florida. Duke is frequently referenced on the show, and Martin is sometimes shown speaking to him on the phone or returning from visiting with him. Duke is divorced and has a son, as well as a daughter named Marie (played by Teri Hatcher) who briefly dates Frasier in the sixth-season episode "First, Do No Harm".

 James James''' (James Oliver) is a barista and waiter at Cafe Nervosa. He appeared in thirteen episodes over the course of the series, and often interacted with the main characters in the cafe. His first appearance was in 2001, and his last was in 2003. Somewhat indifferent or emotionless, he is described by Frasier as 'unflappable'. In the episode "Deathtrap", he pitches in an idea to Roz about how to make Alice's new pet hamster be quiet; suggesting "moving the cage to another room".

 Waitress 
Luck Hari played a never-named waitress at Cafe Nervosa during seasons 1 through 4.  She appeared in eleven episodes, perhaps most memorably in "My Coffee With Niles", where she appeared in the episode's final reflective moment with Frasier.

 Dr. Frasier Crane Show callers 
Voices for callers who phone in to the Dr. Frasier Crane Show'' were provided, in many cases, by famous actors and other personalities. Very often, they would literally call in to the studio to record their parts, without having to appear in person.

Since these voices were added in post-production, callers' lines were spoken during live studio filming by crewpersons or other actors—including, very often, Arleen Sorkin, the wife of executive producer Christopher Lloyd. Sorkin appeared in a live cameo during the series finale, "Goodnight, Seattle".

Some performers would later appear on the show as unrelated characters. For instance, Linda Hamilton played the final caller during the pilot episode, "The Good Son", and later appeared in the season four finale.

There were only three performers to make a call into the show and appear later in the episode. Lilith Sternin, Frasier's ex-wife, in the episode "The Show Where Lilith Comes Back" when she calls in to make a criticism of his advice to a previous caller.  He then makes plans to meet her after Roz, knowing all about Frasier's tumultuous relationship with his ex, suggests taking her out for dinner live on air so that he has no choice but to accept. The second was Renée Lippin, who played Kari in the episode "Someone to Watch Over Me". Kari is Frasier's stalker who calls into the show and is seen at the SeaBea awards. Woody Boyd, the bartender at Cheers, calls in to the show because he is stuck driving in circles at the airport. He and Frasier reminisce on their Cheers days later in the show.

Occasionally, the problem mentioned by a caller served as the main plot for the show, such as Gretchen (Glenne Headly), who worried that her husband was having an affair with a woman whom Frasier suspected of being Niles's wife, Maris. In a similar episode "A Word to the Wiseguy", Frasier receives a call from Brandy, the girlfriend of a shady businessman, saying she wants to leave him after Frasier promised he would counsel the woman into marrying her boyfriend.

Very often, the caller's problem is a deliberate joke on that actor's real-life. For instance, Cindy Crawford, a model and spokeswoman for a make-up company, played a manicurist.

References 

 
Frasier
Frasier